Tulad ng Dati (Filipino: "Just Like Before") is the ninth studio album by the Dawn, released in 2006. It comprises two CDs, one an audio CD and the other a mixed-media CD containing music videos of various the Dawn songs, including vintage footage of the late Teddy Diaz playing a guitar solo and acoustic versions of newer material. The carrier single is Ang Iyong Paalam released in 2006, and the 2nd single Difference.

Track listing
All tracks written and composed by the Dawn.

Disc 1
 "Tulad ng Dati" ("Just Like Before")
 "Alam Ko, Alam N'yo" ("I Know, You Know")
 "Babaeng Mahiwaga" ("Mysterious Woman")
 "Love (Will Set Us Free)"
 "Little Paradise"
 "Abot Kamay" ("Within Reach")
 "Beyond the Bend"
 "Iisang Bangka Tayo" ("We Are in One Boat")
 "Salimpusa" ("Paper Tiger")
 "Dreams"
 "Talaga Naman" ("Indeed")
 "Run Away"
 "Enveloped Ideas"
 "Salamat" ("Thank You")
 "I Stand with You"
 "Ang Iyong Paalam" ("Your Farewell")
 "Difference"
 "Kasama sa Tagumpay" ("Companion in Victory")

Disc 2

Videos
 Tulad ng Dati movie trailer
 Teddy's guitar solo
 "Iisang Bangka"
 "Harapin ang Liwanag"
 "Tulad ng Dati"
 "Change"
 "Laging Narito"

Audio tracks
 "Abot Kamay" (acoustic)
 "Salamat" (acoustic)

Personnel

The Dawn
 Jett Pangan - vocals
 JB Leonor - drums, inlay photo
 Francis Reyes - acoustic, electric and ambient guitars, thumb piano, dan tranh, vocals, cover and miscellaneous photos
 Buddy Zabala - bass guitar, additional guitars, keyboards

Additional musicians
 Mon Legaspi - bass guitar on "Tulad ng Dati"
 Atsushi Matsuura - rhythm guitar on "Tulad ng Dati"
 Raffy Francisco - saxophone on "Talaga Naman"
 Andre Medina - blues harp on "Abot Kamay"
 Bituin Escalante - intro vocals on "Enveloped Ideas"

Miscellaneous
 Shinji Tanaka, Mark Laccay - engineers at Sound Creation Studios
 Alexander Dumlao, Jippo Cervantes, Mark Laccay - engineers at Sweetspot Studios
 Noel DeBrackinghe & Mark Laccay - mixing
 Noel DeBrackinghe - mastering
 Ariz Guinto - recording & mixing on "Tulad ng Dati"
 Ross Locsin Laccay - album design & layout
 Niña Sandejas - miscellaneous photos
 Nix Puno - new The Dawn logo design

References

The Dawn (band) albums
2006 albums